Kabir Thaufiq (born 10 May 1997) is an Indian professional footballer who plays as a goalkeeper for Chennai City in the I-League.

Career
On 7 February 2018, Kabir made his professional debut at the age of 20 years in the I-League for Chennai City against Mohun Bagan. He started and played full match as Chennai City drew 0–0.

Honours
Chennai City
I-League: 2018–19

References

External links

Living people
People from Tamil Nadu
Indian footballers
Chennai City FC players
Association football goalkeepers
Footballers from Bangalore
I-League players
1997 births